Ivan Pavletic (born March 21, 1974) is a Croatian American actor, director, and writer. He wrote and directed the film 476 A.D..

Filmography

References

External links

1974 births
Croatian directors
American directors
Croatian male actors
American male actors
Living people